Kenneth Celera Duremdes (born January 31, 1974) is a Filipino retired professional basketball player in the Philippine Basketball Association and the current commissioner of the Maharlika Pilipinas Basketball League (MPBL). Nicknamed as "Captain Marbel", Duremdes is also a former PBA Most Valuable Player in 1998, and a former member of the Philippine national basketball team.

Amateur career
Duremdes played for Adamson University in the UAAP during the mid-90s and was touted as one of the future PBA superstars. He also played in the Philippine Basketball League where he had solid credentials.

One of Adamson University's greatest players, Duremdes immediately gave basketball fans a glimpse of his talent, earning Rookie of the Year honors with Burger Machine back in 1993 in the PBL.

Under the tutelage of coach Perry Ronquillo, Duremdes turned from a raw cager into a fearless slasher, and was instrumental in giving Burger Machine a championship in 1994. After two years with the PBL, Duremdes moved on to the PBA and was picked third overall in the 1995 draft.

PBA career

Sunkist and Pop Cola
In 1995, Duremdes was selected by the Sunkist Orange Juicers as the 3rd overall in the rookie draft. His team won the PBA All-Filipino and the PBA Commissioner's Cup conference titles despite playing a limited role behind 1995 MVP Vergel Meneses, Bonel Balingit, Nelson Asaytono and Boybits Victoria.

However, Duremdes was on the bench for most of his time with the then-renamed Pop Cola 800s despite the departure of Asaytono from the team. After languishing on the bench, Pop Cola traded him and Jack Tanuan to Alaska for Dwight Lago and Boyet Fernandez.

Alaska Milkmen
After his arrival with the 1996 Grandslam champions, Duremdes' career took a big rise. He had a strong showing with the Milkmen's Governors Cup title conquest of Purefoods.

In 1998, Duremdes led Alaska to the All-Filipino and Commissioner's Cup titles during the said year. He also won the Commissioner's Cup Best Player honors. Before leading the Philippines to a bronze-medal finish in the 1998 Asian Games in Bangkok, Duremdes was named as the league's Most Valuable Player at age 24.

He continued to have MVP numbers from 1999–2000, in which he led the Milkmen to the 2000 All-Filipino title. After becoming a free agent, he signed a reported 48 million peso to stay with the Aces in 2001, despite offers from teams such as the Mobiline Phone Pals. With Alaska focusing itself on rebuilding the team, Duremdes became the top man for the Aces along with young players John Arigo and Ali Peek. In 2002, he again played for the country in the Busan Asian Games, becoming one of the most notable players on the squad. However, the squad failed to win a medal in the said event. Duremdes then led Alaska to a runner-up finish in the season-ending All-Filipino Conference.

In 2000, he became a member of the PBA's 25 Greatest Player's List, the youngest of the group.

Sta. Lucia Realtors
In 2003, Duremdes was surprisingly traded from Alaska to the Sta. Lucia Realtors for a future first round pick (which turned out to be Brandon Cablay). The trade stunned everyone in attendance and made the Realtors one of the formidable contenders to win a PBA crown with the trio of Duremdes, Marlou Aquino and Dennis Espino. Despite big numbers in his first season with Sta. Lucia, he failed to lead the squad to a single championship. However, in the 2003 All-Star Game, he led the Commissioner's All-Star in a win over the Governor's team after scoring a buzzer-beating layup in the final seconds.

Injuries hampered Duremdes in the 2004 Fiesta Conference but he still played in the All-Star Game. He only played for 47 games that year as several nagging injuries affected him. Duremdes saw action in the TM Legends Game, pitting several members of the PBA's 25 Greatest Players. In the 2005-2006 season, Duremdes saw limited action due to injuries, as well as his limited playing minutes. In last Philippine Cup, he led all scorers with 22 points-per-game.

Coca-Cola Tigers
In 2007, Duremdes was traded to Coca-Cola along with Alex Cabagnot and Ricky Calimag for Manny Ramos and Dennis Miranda. And in 2008, he was named as the head coach of the Coca-Cola Tigers, ending his career as a basketball player.

On March 23, 2012, before a game between Alaska and Powerade, the Tigers retired his jersey. They went on to lose to the Aces in overtime, 102–100, despite having a 16-point lead.

Coaching career
Duremdes was hired by his college alma mater Adamson University as the head coach of its basketball team, replacing Leo Austria, who decided not to renew his contract with the Falcons. The team manager of the Adamson Falcons confirmed the choice of Duremdes as the Falcons' new head coach. Following a dismal campaign in Season 77 (finished 8th in the standings, 1-13 win–loss record), Duremdes was fired by the team management citing a "need for full-time mentor" for the young Falcon team. He was replaced by one of his assistants, Michael A. Fermin who played for UP Fighting Maroons in the early 1990s.

National team career
In 1994, he was included in the national team that played in the Hiroshima Asian Games.

In 1998, Duremdes was again named to the Philippine Centennial Team for the Bangkok Asian Games. He had outstanding numbers against teams from Asia and led the country to a bronze-medal finish. The country also won the Jones Cup in Taiwan the same year. He led all scorers in the 1998 Asian Games and the 1998 Jones cup averaging 11.9 point per game and 17.3 point per game, respectively.

In 2002, Duremdes once again took part in the national team that played in the Busan Asian Games.

Achievements

Philippine Basketball Association
 1998 and 2000 Mythical First Team
 1998 Most Valuable Player
 1996, 1999 and 2001 Mythical Second Team
 1998 Commissioner's Cup Best Player of the Conference
 1998 All-Filipino Cup and 1998 Commissioner's Cup Finals Most Valuable Player
 2000 All-Filipino Cup Best Player of the Conference
 1996 All-Star Game Most Valuable Player
 9-time All-Star
 PBA's 500 Three-Point Club Member
 PBA's 25 Greatest Players Member

Philippine Basketball League
 PBL's 20 Greatest Players Member
 1993 Most Valuable Player

Philippine national team
 1998 Asian Games Bronze Medalist
 1998 Jones Cup Champion Centennial Team

Coaching record

UAAP

PBA

Personal life
Kenneth Duremdes married Vanessa Cariaga in 1993 at the Manila City Hall, and the ceremony was officiated by Reverend Jesus Mesa before witnesses Manolita San Luis and Nora Atienzo. Duremdes contracted a second marriage with Theresa Ibasco in 1996. Cariaga filed a bigamy lawsuit against him. Thereafter, he filed an annulment of marriage case which was later dismissed by a Quezon City regional trial court, Branch 255. The ruling was affirmed on October 21, 2008, by the Philippine Court of Appeals' 9th division.

References

External links
 PBA.ph: Kenneth Duremdes Player Profile
 Adamson great Duremdes gets head-coaching job as Austria 'takes a break'
 UNTV Cup Season 3 'featuring' Kenneth Duremdes 

1974 births
Living people
Alaska Aces (PBA) players
Asian Games bronze medalists for the Philippines
Asian Games medalists in basketball
Basketball players at the 1994 Asian Games
Basketball players at the 1998 Asian Games
Basketball players at the 2002 Asian Games
Basketball players from South Cotabato
Filipino men's basketball coaches
People from South Cotabato
Philippine Basketball Association All-Stars
Powerade Tigers coaches
Philippine Basketball Association players with retired numbers
Philippines men's national basketball team players
Filipino men's basketball players
Pop Cola Panthers players
Powerade Tigers players
Notre Dame Educational Association alumni
Shooting guards
Small forwards
Sta. Lucia Realtors players
Adamson Soaring Falcons basketball players
Visayan people
Medalists at the 1998 Asian Games
Pop Cola Panthers draft picks
Adamson Soaring Falcons basketball coaches